The Croatian Orienteering Federation is the national Orienteering Association in Croatia. It is recognized as the  orienteering association for Croatia by the International Orienteering Federation, of which it is a member. It is also a member of the Croatian Olympic Committee.

References

International Orienteering Federation members
Orienteering